The suit of Coins is one of the four card suits used in Latin-suited playing cards alongside Swords, Cups and Batons. These suits are used in Spanish, Italian and some tarot card packs. This suit has maintained its original identity from Chinese money-suited cards. Symbol on Italian pattern cards:    Symbol on Spanish pattern cards:    Symbol on French Aluette cards:

Characteristics 
In Spain, the suit of Coins is known as oros and the court cards are known as the Rey (King), Caballo (Knight or Cavalier) and Sota (Knave or Valet). The Spanish play with packs of 40 or 48 cards. There are no Tens and, in the shorter pack, the Nines and Eights are also dropped. Thus the suit of Coins ranks: R C S (9 8) 7 6 5 4 3 2 1. In Italy the suit is known as denari and the corresponding court cards are the Re, Cavallo and Fante. Either 40 or 52-card packs are used. In the shorter packs, the Tens, Nines and Eights are removed. Card ranking is thus: R C F (10 9 8) 7 6 5 4 3 2 1. In the French Vendée where they play Aluette with a special pattern of 48 Spanish-suited cards, the suit is called denier and there are the courts are the Roi, Cavalière, (female Cavalier) and Valet (Jack).

The suit of coins is also one of the four suits used in those tarot packs used for cartomancy.

Individual cards 

 Seven of Coins. The Seven of Coins is the most valuable individual card in Italy's national game of Scopa. Known as the sette bello ("beautiful seven"), capturing it is one of four achievements that earns a game point.

 Ace of Coins. In some Italian patterns the ace of Coins is represented by an Eagle

See also 
 Spanish-suited playing cards
 Italian playing cards
 Coins - suit used in divinatory tarot cards

Notes and references

Literature 
 

Card suits